Sabine Volz (born 12 July 1990) is a German canoeist. She began paddling when she was 6 years old in Raunheim, Germany. Volz is part of the Rheinbruder Karlsruhe club. In 2019, she was on Ninja Warrior Germany.

References

1990 births
Living people
German female canoeists